Pietro Bianchi may refer to:
Pietro Bianchi (gymnast) (1883–1965), Italian gymnast
Pietro Bianchi (painter) (1694–1740), Italian painter
Pietro Bianchi (weightlifter) (1895–1962), Italian weightlifter
Pietro Bianchi (basketball), see Rosters of the top basketball teams in European club competitions